Akhil Bharatiya Rashtravadi Kisan Sangathan is a non-political party started  by the founder of Ranvir Sena, Brahmeshwar Singh (Mukhiyaji) also known as the Leader of Kisan on 5 May 2012. The party was started in Patna with the focus of non-violently defending the rights of farmers and other manual workers. The party was declared as an apolitical group which will not contest the elections.

The party had in past held protest meeting in support of its leader Brahmeshwar Singh and others.

References 

Political parties in Bihar
Agrarian parties in India
2012 establishments in Bihar
Political parties established in 2012